The 2020 United States presidential election in Washington was held on Tuesday, November 3, 2020, as part of the 2020 United States presidential election in which all 50 U.S. states plus the District of Columbia participated. Washington voters chose electors to represent them in the Electoral College via a popular vote, pitting the Republican Party's nominee, incumbent President Donald Trump, and running mate Vice President Mike Pence against Democratic Party nominee, former Vice President Joe Biden, and his running mate California Senator Kamala Harris. Washington has 12 electoral votes in the Electoral College.

Prior to the election, most news organizations forecast Washington as a state that Biden would win, or a safe blue state. Biden won the state by 19.2%, the largest margin for a presidential candidate of any party since 1964. He also flipped the swing county of Clallam, which now holds the record for the longest ongoing streak of voting for the national winner, having supported the winning candidate in every election since 1980. Biden also became the candidate with the highest vote total in the state's history, with 2,369,612 votes. This was the first time since 1988 that Washington voted to the left of Illinois.

The Seattle area, home to almost two-thirds of the state's population, is overwhelmingly Democratic. Despite this, even if you remove the votes from King, Snohomish, and Pierce counties (the entire Seattle metropolitan area), Biden would have carried the state by over 4,000 votes. However, Trump won a considerable majority in outlying communities, garnering over 70% of the vote in rural counties such as Columbia. Eastern Washington is very rural and leans Republican, partly due to the strong tinge of social conservatism it shares with neighboring Idaho, a GOP stronghold. That said, Biden was able to improve on Clinton's margin in Whitman County--anchored by the college town of Pullman--increasing it from 4.1% in 2016 to 10.2% in 2020, the best performance for a Democrat in the county since 1936. In addition, he narrowed Trump's margin in Spokane County from 8.4% to 4.3%. Biden earned 75% of the vote in King County, home to Seattle. This was the largest margin by any candidate in a presidential race since the county's creation.

Per exit polls by the Associated Press, Biden's strength in Washington came from 59% among white voters and 79% among Asian-Americans. 34% of voters were irreligious and supported Biden by 78%. Additionally, a majority of Native Americans in the state backed Biden by about 65%, with some tribes supporting Biden by over 80%. Biden also became the first Democrat since Washington's admission into the union to win the presidency without winning Mason County, the first Democrat since John F. Kennedy in 1960 to prevail without winning Cowlitz County, and the first Democrat since Woodrow Wilson in 1916 to prevail without winning Grays Harbor County and Pacific County.

Primary elections
The primaries for the major parties were on March 10, 2020. On March 14, 2019, Governor Jay Inslee signed a bill moving the state's presidential primary up from May to the second Tuesday in March.

Republican primary
Donald Trump, Bill Weld, Joe Walsh, and Rocky de la Fuente had declared their candidacy for the Republican Party, but only Trump met all of the state party's criteria by the official deadline of January 21, 2020, for being included on the ballot. Thus Trump essentially ran unopposed in the Republican primary, and thus he received all of Washington's 43 delegates to the 2020 Republican National Convention.

Democratic primary
A number of Democratic Party candidates ran or expressed interest in running. Additionally, Seattle-based billionaire Howard Schultz announced a potential bid as an independent in early 2019, but backed out in September of that year. The party's candidates included on the ballot at the deadline were Michael Bennet, Joe Biden, Michael Bloomberg, Cory Booker, Pete Buttigieg, John Delaney, Tulsi Gabbard, Amy Klobuchar, Deval Patrick, Bernie Sanders, Tom Steyer, Elizabeth Warren and Andrew Yang.

Green primary
As a minor party, Washington State's Green Party affiliate is excluded from the publicly funded Presidential Primary in Washington State. The Green Party of Washington facilitated its primary by a mail-in ballot to its members after its Spring Convention on May 23 (deadline was June 13).

All candidates recognized by the Green Party of the United States by April 23 were on the ballot, plus a write-in option:
 Howie Hawkins
 Dario Hunter
 David Rolde

General election

Final predictions

Polling

Graphical summary

Aggregate polls

Polls

<noinclude>

Donald Trump vs. Pete Buttigieg

with Donald Trump and Kamala Harris

Donald Trump vs. Bernie Sanders

Donald Trump vs. Elizabeth Warren

with Donald Trump and generic Democrat

Electoral slates
These slates of electors were nominated by each party in order to vote in the Electoral College should their candidate win the state:

Results

By winning nearly 58% of the vote, Joe Biden's performance was the best showing for a presidential candidate of any party in Washington since Lyndon B. Johnson's landslide victory in 1964.

By county

Counties that flipped from Republican to Democratic 
Clallam County (largest municipality: Port Angeles)

By congressional district
Biden won 7 of 10 congressional districts with the remaining 3 going to Trump.

See also
 United States presidential elections in Washington (state)
 Presidency of Joe Biden
 2020 United States presidential election
 2020 Democratic Party presidential primaries
 2020 Republican Party presidential primaries
 2020 United States elections

Notes

References

External links
 
 
  (State affiliate of the U.S. League of Women Voters)
 

Washington
2020
Presidential